Javier Sanz Celma (born December 20, 1953) is a Spanish sprint canoer who competed in the early 1970s. He was eliminated in the repechages of the K-4 1000 m event at the 1972 Summer Olympics in Munich. Sanz also competed in the K-4 10000 m event at the 1974 ICF Canoe Sprint World Championships in Mexico City his team ending up in fifth place.

References

Sports-reference.com profile

1953 births
Canoeists at the 1972 Summer Olympics
Living people
Olympic canoeists of Spain
Spanish male canoeists
20th-century Spanish people